Faner Hall located at 1000 Faner Drive, Carbondale, Illinois, named after Robert D. Faner, former English professor who died in the 1960s, is in the central part of the Southern Illinois University Carbondale campus, and houses the College of Liberal Arts (COLA), which includes multiple departments including the University Museum

Designed by Robert Geddes, Brecher, Qualls and Cunningham architects, in the Brutalist architecture style.  Faner Hall is 914 feet long and four stories high.  It acts as a "wall" between the old and new sections of campus.

Departments
Faner Hall houses many of the departments which belong to the University Core Curriculum as well as other areas of study.  Departments include: Africana Studies, Anthropology, Art & Design, Communication Studies, Criminology & Criminal Justice, Economics, English, Geography & Environmental Resources, History, Languages, Cultures & International Trade, Linguistics, Paralegal Studies, Philosophy, Political Science and Sociology.

References

External links 
 
 List of Brutalist style structures

Southern Illinois University Carbondale
Carbondale, Illinois
Buildings and structures in Jackson County, Illinois
Buildings and structures completed in 1974
1974 establishments in Illinois
1970s architecture in the United States
Brutalist architecture in Illinois
Modernist architecture in Illinois